The Our Lady of the Assumption Cathedral is a religious building belonging to the Catholic Church, which is located in the city of Ningbo in Zhejiang Province in the People's Republic of China.

The church follows the Roman or Latin rite and functions as the headquarters of Diocese of Ningbo (Dioecesis Nimpuovensis, 天主教宁波教区) which was created on 11 April 1946. It should not be confused with Sacred Heart Cathedral (耶稣圣心主教座堂) in the same city that was destroyed by fire on July 28, 2014 and started as the "Church of the Seven Sorrows of Mary" in 1872.

The present building dates from 1853, was rebuilt in 1865 and modified between 1995 and 2000.

See also
Roman Catholicism in China
Our Lady of the Assumption Church (disambiguation)

References

Roman Catholic cathedrals in China
Buildings and structures in Ningbo
Roman Catholic churches completed in 1853
Churches in Zhejiang
19th-century Roman Catholic church buildings in China